Jakub Holuša (born 20 February 1988) is a former Czech middle-distance runner. He represented his country in the men's 800 meters at the 2008 and 2012 Summer Olympics.  At the 2016 Olympics, he competed in the 1500 meters.

Running career
Holuša first took up athletics in the steeplechase discipline. He made his international debut at the 2005 World Youth Championships in Athletics, where he finished seventh overall in the boys' 2000-meter steeplechase. He gradually switched from training for the steeplechase to focusing on the 800 meters, for which he qualified for the 2008 Summer Olympics. After many years of racing as an 800-meter runner, he broke out in the 1500 meters when he ran a sub-3:40 result in the men's 1500 at the World Indoor Championships. He subsequently became Europe's 1500-meter indoor champion when he placed first at the 2015 European Indoor Championships.

In February 2022, he ended his career and became a coach in Dukla Prague athletics club.

International competitions

Personal bests
Outdoor
 800 m 1:45.12 (11 May 2012, Doha, Qatar)
 1000 m 2:16.79 (17 June 2014, Ostrava, Czech Republic)
 1500 m 3:32.49 (20 July 2018, Monaco) - NR
 3000 m 7:51,39 (2017, France)
 3000 m steeplechase 8:50.30 (20 July 2007, Hengelo, Netherlands)

Indoor
 800 m 1:46.09 (31 January 2010, Karlsruhe, Germany)
 1000 m 2:18.27 (17 February 2016, Stockholm, Sweden)
 1500 m 3:37.68 (8 March 2015, Prague, Czech Republic)

References

1988 births
Living people
Czech male middle-distance runners
Athletes (track and field) at the 2008 Summer Olympics
Athletes (track and field) at the 2012 Summer Olympics
Athletes (track and field) at the 2016 Summer Olympics
Olympic athletes of the Czech Republic
Sportspeople from Opava
Czech male steeplechase runners
World Athletics Championships athletes for the Czech Republic
Czech Athletics Championships winners